Nicola Gaston is a Professor and the President of the New Zealand Association of Scientists. She is a materials scientist who has worked on nanoparticles, and has spoken out on sexism in the scientific research establishment.

Academic career 
Gaston was born in England to New Zealand parents.

Gaston is a Professor in the Department of Physics at the University of Auckland. She was previously a Senior Lecturer in the School of Chemical and Physical Sciences at Victoria University of Wellington.

After being a Principal Investigator at the MacDiarmid Institute since 2010, she was appointed co-director in 2018.

Her research interests include understanding how and why the properties of clusters of atoms, such as their melting points, depend on size and electronic structure. For example, adding an extra atom of gallium to a cluster can change its melting point by 100 Kelvins.

She was awarded the CMMSE prize in 2016 for important contributions in the developments of Numerical Methods for Physics, Chemistry, Engineering and Economics.

Public profile 
Gaston has been a strong advocate for women in science, arguing that science is sexist in national media. She argues that women are well-represented in junior university positions, even forming the majority in some scientific disciplines, but through unconscious bias or stereotyping are lost to academia, which ends up dominated by men in senior positions. One reason is the unforgiving nature of the research establishment to gaps in a CV caused by child-rearing. Gaston explored these impediments to the participation of women scientists in her blog, "Why Science is Sexist", and in 2015 published a book of the same name with Bridget Williams Books.

As President of the New Zealand Association of Scientists Gaston publicly criticised the adoption of the National Science Challenges, due to the possible conflicting roles of the Prime Minister's Science Advisor and the marginalisation of Māori. She has however praised the stability of funding provided for the National Science Challenges as well as the development of the National Statement of Science Investment in mitigating some of the concerns surrounding the adoption of the National Science Challenges.

Selected publications

External links 

 "Why Science is Sexist" (Gaston's blog)

References 

Living people
New Zealand chemists
New Zealand women chemists
University of Auckland alumni
Massey University alumni
New Zealand nanotechnologists
New Zealand women's rights activists
Year of birth missing (living people)
Academic staff of the University of Auckland